The Sun Fast 30 One Design is a French sailboat that was designed in 2022 by Van Peteghem/Lauriot-Prevost as an offshore one design racer with production starting in 2023.

Production
The design is built by Jeanneau in Cheviré, near Nantes, in France, starting in 2023.

Design
The boat was announced in November 2022 and was based on a concept developed by the UNCL-Racing Division of the Yacht Club de France, the British Royal Ocean Racing Club, and the American Storm Trysail Club. Those clubs saw a need for a more affordable offshore one design racer that would allow national and international competition. To choose a new boat, they initiated a design competition entitled Class 30: Let's Build the Future. This was won by the design firm of VPLP design working with racing boat builder Multiplast. Jeanneau will actually build the boat and provide marketing, distribution and technical support, while Multiplast handles the design prototyping, preform and mold construction, startup of class association organization, racing program and sales oversight.

The boat is designed and constructed to be more ecologically sustainable than past boats. It is built using Elium thermoplastic resin especially for boat construction, which was developed over three years by Arkema in conjunction with Jeanneau's parent company, the Bénéteau Group. Elium is made from 20% recycled material and is 100% recyclable. This allows production waste to be reused and also means the boats themselves are recyclable.

The Sun Fast 30 One Design is a racing keelboat, built predominantly of Elium thermoplastic resin. It has a 9/10 fractional sloop rig with a bowsprit, a semi-scow plumb stem, an open transom, twin transom-hung rudders controlled by a single tiller and a fixed fin keel with a weighted bulb. It displaces  and carries  of ballast.

The fuel tank for the diesel engine installation holds . Either engine qualifies for the one design class.

The design has sleeping accommodation for five people, with a two "V"-berths in the bow cabin, a straight settee and twin seat in the main cabin and two aft cabins, each with a single berth. A navigation station is fitted on the starboard side. The head is located just aft of the bow cabin on the starboard side.

For sailing downwind the design may be equipped with an asymmetrical spinnaker.

See also
List of sailing boat types

References

External links

Keelboats
2020s sailboat type designs
Sailing yachts
One-design sailing classes
Sailing yachts designed by VPLP
Sailboat types built by Jeanneau
Sailboat types built by Multiplast